This article is a list of important rail yards in geographical order. These listed may be termed Classification, Freight, Marshalling, Shunting, or Switching yards, which are cultural terms generally meaning the same thing no matter which part of the world's railway traditions originated the term of art.

These are important marshalling yards for the formation of freight/goods trains, and/or with a large volume of traffic, and/or with a very extensive track systems; including classification yards, hump yards, freight handling yards, and intermodal (container) terminals.

See also 
 Rail transport

Notes 
Names of the nearest cities etc. are presented in the common usage, and shown first followed by a colon, unless the specific yard name is known (which will be presented in the form native to their country. possibly transliterated)
If known, the number of tracks are shown in brackets, with two numbers e.g. (xx + xx) for yards with 'up' and 'down' lines.
This article does not amount to an exhaustive list, and may never be complete.
Yards marked with a star (asterisk) may no longer be in use.
The nearest city of town is given first: if the yard has a well known name that differs.

North America

Canada 
From west to east

Nanaimo, British Columbia
Wellcox Yard (SVI, Marshalling, Barge operation by Seaspan ULC) 
 Vancouver, British Columbia
Coquitlam Yard (CP, Intermodal and Marshalling)
VIF Intermodal (CP, Intermodal)
Williston Yard (CP, Intermodal, Grain)
Thornton Yard (CN, Intermodal and Marshalling)
North Vancouver Yard (CN, Marshalling)
Lulu Island Yard (CN, Marshalling)
Trapp Yard (SRY, Marshalling)
New Yard (BNSF, Marshalling)
Glen Yard (BNSF, Marshalling)
Main Yard (BNSF, Marshalling)
Vancouver Reliability Center (VIA, Coach Yard & Shop)
 Kamloops, British Columbia
Kamloops CP Yard (CP, Marshalling)
Kamloops CN Yard (CN, Intermodal and Marshalling)
 Golden, British Columbia
Golden Yard (CP, Marshalling, Coal Staging Yard)
Trail, British Columbia
Tadanac Yard (CP, Marshalling )
Cranbrook, British Columbia
Cranbrook yard (CP, Marshalling)
 Edmonton, Alberta
Bissell Yard (CN, Marshalling)
Cloverbar Yard (CN, Marshalling)
Dunvegan Yard (CN, Railcar Storage)
Scotford Yard (CN, Marshalling)
Scotford Yard (CP, Marshalling)
Lambton Park Yard (CP, Marshalling)
D.L. MacDonald Yard (ETS)
McBain Yard (CN, Intermodal)
Strathcona Yard (CP, Intermodal and Marshalling)
Walker Yard (CN, Marshalling)
 Calgary, Alberta
Alyth Yard (CP, Marshalling)
Ogden Park (CP headquarters campus,)
Shepard Yard (CP, Intermodal)
Manchester Yard (CP, Marshalling, Storage)
Keith Yard (CP, Marshalling, Storage)
Sarcee Yard (CN, Intermodal and Marshalling)
Calgary Logistics Park (CN, Marshalling, Intermodal, industry servicing)
Anderson Garage (Calgary Transit)
Oliver Bowen Maintenance Centre (Calgary Transit)
Lethbridge, Alberta
Kipp Yard (CP, Marshalling)
Churchill Industrial Yard (CP, Marshalling)
Medicine Hat, Alberta
Medicine Hat Yard (CP, Marshalling)
Dunmore Yard (CP, Marshalling)
 Moose Jaw, Saskatchewan
Moose Jaw Yard (CP, Marshalling)
 Regina, Saskatchewan
Regina Yard (CP, Intermodal and Marshalling)
Warell Yard (CN, Marshalling)
 Saskatoon, Saskatchewan
Chappell Yard (CN, Intermodal and Marshalling)
Sutherland Yard (CP, Intermodal and Marshalling)
 Melville, Saskatchewan
Melville Yard (CN, Marshalling)
 Winnipeg, Manitoba
 Burlington Northern Santa Fe Manitoba Yard (BNSF Manitoba)
 East Yard (CN, now the Forks)*
 Fort Rouge Yard (CN)
 Via Rail Winnipeg Maintenance Centre (Via Rail)
 Greater Winnipeg Water District St. Boniface Yard (GWWDR)
 North Transcona Yard (CP)
 Central Manitoba Railway Yard (CEMR)
 St. Boniface Yard (CPR)
 Symington Yard (CN, Intermodal and Hump Yard)
 Transcona Yard (CN)
 Winnipeg Yard (CP, Intermodal and Hump Yard)
 Weston Shops
 Thunder Bay, Ontario
Thunder Bay Yard (CP, Intermodal, Marshalling and Grain Staging)
Neebing Yard (CN, Marshalling)
 Sudbury, Ontario
Sudbury Yard (CP, Marshalling)
Capreol Yard (CN, Marshalling)
 Cambridge, Ontario
Hagey Yard (CP)
 Toronto, Ontario
Toronto Yard sometimes referred to as Agincourt Yard (CP, Marshalling, Former Hump Yard, Automotive compound)
Don Yard (GO Transit layover facility, ex-CN Don Sorting Yard)
North Bathurst Yard (GO Transit layover facility)
Vaughan Intermodal Terminal (CP, Intermodal)
MacMillan Yard (CN, Hump Yard)
Brampton Intermodal Terminal (CN, Intermodal)
Lambton/West Toronto Yards (CP, Marshalling)
CPR Parkdale Yard (ex-CVR 1871–1883/ex-CPR 1883-1890s, marshalling and repair yards, closed and removed mid 1980s)
Willowbrook Rail Maintenance Facility (GO Transit facility, ex-CN Mimico Yard, current Willowbrook Yard)
Whitby Rail Maintenance Facility (GO Transit facility)
Via Toronto Maintenance Centre (Via Rail Passenger Yard, former CN Mimico Yard)
Oakville (CN, Marshalling)
Aldershot (CN, Marshalling)
 Hamilton, Ontario
CPR Aberdeen Yard (CP, Marshalling)
Stuart St. Yard (CN/SOR, Marshalling)
Parkdale Yard (CN/SOR, Marshalling)
 London, Ontario
Quebec St. Yard (CP, Marshalling)
London Yard (CN, Marshalling)
 Sarnia, Ontario
Sarnia Yard (CN, Marshalling)
 Englehart, Ontario (ONR, Marshalling)
 Ottawa, Ontario
 Walkley Yard (CN, Marshalling)
 Montreal, Quebec
Taschereau Yard (CN, Intermodal and Marshalling – former hump yard)
St. Luc Yard (CP, Marshalling, Expressway)
Lachine (CP, Intermodal)
Hochelaga Yard (CP, Intermodal)
Turcot (CN, Intermodal – Abandoned)
Rivière-des-Prairies (CN, Marshalling)
Southwark Yard (CN, Marshalling)
 Farnham, Quebec (MMA, Marshalling)
 Trois-Rivières, Quebec (CFQG, Marshalling)
Saint-Georges [Mauricie,] Quebec
Garneau Yard (CN, Marshalling)
 Quebec City, Quebec
Joffre Yard (CN, Marshalling)
Sainte-Foy (CN, Marshalling)
Henri-IV Yard (CFQG, Marshalling)
Limoilou (CN/CFC, Marshalling)
 Mont-Joli, Quebec (CN, Marshalling)
 La Tuque, Quebec
Fitzpatrick Yard (CN, Marshalling)
 Richmond, Quebec (CN/SLQ, Marshalling)
 Moncton, New Brunswick
Gordon Yard (CN, Marshalling)
 Saint John, New Brunswick
Island Yard (CN/NBSR, Marshalling/Intermodal)
Dever Rd. Yard (NBSR, Marshalling)
 Halifax, Nova Scotia
Rockingham Yard (CN, Marshalling)
 Truro, Nova Scotia (CN/CBNS, Marshalling)
 Stellarton, Nova Scotia (CBNS, Marshalling)

United States 
By state in alphabetical order:

Alabama
 Birmingham: Boyles Yard (CSXT)
 Birmingham: East Thomas Yard (BNSF Railway)
 Decatur: Oakworth Yard (CSXT)
 Fairfield: Ensley Yard (Birmingham Southern Railroad)
 Irondale: Norris Yard (Norfolk Southern Railway)
 Mobile: Sibert Yard (CSXT)
 Muscle Shoals: Sheffield Yard (NS)

Arkansas
 North Little Rock: North Little Rock Yard (Union Pacific Railroad)
 Pine Bluff: Pine Bluff Yard (Union Pacific Railroad)
 Marion: Marion Intermodal Terminal (Union Pacific Railroad)

California
 Barstow: Barstow Yard (BNSF)
 City of Industry: Industry Yard (UP)
 Colton: West Colton Yard (UP)
 Commerce: East Yard (UP)
 Commerce: Hobart Yard (BNSF)
 Fresno: Calwa Yard (BNSF)
 Los Angeles: Aurant Yard (UP)
 Los Angeles: East Los Angeles Yard (UP)
 Los Angeles: Piggyback Yard (UP)
 Oakland: Desert Yard (UP)
 Roseville: J.R. Davis Yard (largest on the west coast) (UP)

Colorado
 Denver: 36th Street Yard (UP) 
 Denver: Globeville Yard (BNSF)
 Denver: North Yard (former DRGW, UP)
 Denver: Rennix Yard (BNSF, Intermodal)

Connecticut 
 New Haven: Cedar Hill Yard (CSXT/Providence and Worcester/Connecticut Southern/Amtrak)
 Hartford: Hartford Yard (Connecticut Southern/Pan Am Railways)

Delaware
 Wilmington: Edgemoor Yard (NS)
 Wilmington: Wilsmere Yard (CSXT)

District of Columbia
 Washington: Ivy City Yard (Amtrak)
 Washington: Benning Yard (CSXT)

Florida 
 Bradenton: Tropicana Yard (CSXT)
Fort Pierce: Fort Pierce Yard (Florida East Coast) 
Hialeah: Hialeah Yard (CSXT/Tri-Rail/Amtrak) 
 Jacksonville: Bowden Yard (Florida East Coast)
 Jacksonville: Moncrief Yard (CSXT—Former Seaboard Coast Line)
 Jacksonville: Simpson Yard (NS)
 Lakeland: Winston Yard (CSXT)
 New Smyrna Beach: New Smyrna Beach Yard (Florida East Coast)
 Miami: Hialeah Yard (Florida East Coast)
Orlando: Taft Yard (CSXT)
 Tampa: Rockport Yard, Uceta Yard, and Yeoman Yard (CSXT)
Winter Haven: Central Florida Intermodal Logistics Center (CSXT)

Georgia 
 Albany: Atlantic Coast Line Yard (GFRR)
 Albany Central of Georgia Yard (NS)
 Atlanta: Tilford Yard (CSXT) [Closed]
 Atlanta: Hulsey Yard (CSXT) [Closed]
 Atlanta: Inman Yard (NS)
 Atlanta: North Avenue Yards (former)
 Atlanta: Howell Interlocking
 Austell: John W. Whitaker Intermodal Terminal (Norfolk Southern Railway)
 Fairburn: Fairburn Yard (CSXT)
 Macon: Brosnan Yard (NS)
 Rome: Forestville Yard (NS)
 Valdosta: Langdale Yard (NS)
 Waycross: Waycross Rice Yard (CSXT)

Idaho 
Bonner's Ferry: Bonner's Ferry Yard (UP)
Eastport: Eastport Yard (UP/CP)
Hauser: Hauser Yard (BNSF/MRL)
Idaho Falls: Idaho Falls Yard (UP/EIRR)
Minidoka: Minidoka Yard (UP/EIRR) 
Nampa: Nampa Yard (UP/BVRR) 
Plummer: Plummer Yard (STMA/UP)
Pocatello: Pocatello Yard (UP)
Sandpoint: Boyer Yard (BNSF/UP/POVA)
St Marie's: St Maries Yard (STMA)
Twin Falls: Twin Falls Yard (former UP interchange yard), Now Eastern Idaho Railroad headquarters (Watco)

Illinois
 Champaign: Champaign Yard (CN)
 Chicago area
 14th Street Coach Yard (Metra)
 47th Street Yard (NS, intermodal)
 59th Street Yard (CSXT, intermodal, switched by Chicago Rail Link)
 Ashland Avenue Yard (NS, carload freight)
 Aurora (Metra commuter coach yard for BNSF route)
 Barr Yard (CSXT)
 Bedford Park Yard (CSXT, intermodal, switched by Chicago Rail Link)
 Bensenville Yard (CP)
 Blue Island Yard (Indiana Harbor Belt)
 Burnham Yard (South Shore Freight)
 Burr Oak Yard (Iowa Interstate / Chicago Rail Link)
 California Ave Coach Yards (UP)
 Calumet Yard (NS)
 Clearing Yard (BRC, Hump Yard, Intermodal. Marshalling)
 Cicero Yard (BNSF, intermodal)
 Commercial Avenue Yard (BRC)
 Corwith Yards (BNSF, Intermodal)
 East Joliet Yard (Elgin, Joliet & Eastern, now CN)
 Eola Yard (BNSF)
 Glenn Yard (CN)
 Global I (UP, intermodal)
 Global II (UP, intermodal)
 Global III (UP, intermodal)
 Global IV (UP, intermodal)
 Homewood (Harvey): Markham Yard (CN)
 Irondale Yard (Chicago Rail Link)
 Landers Yard (NS, intermodal)
 Logistics Park (BNSF, intermodal)
 Proviso Yard (UP Hump Yard, Intermodal, Marshalling)
 Schiller Park Yard (CN)
 South Chicago Yard (South Chicago & Indiana Harbor Railroad)
 Western Avenue (Metra commuter coach yards, formerly two separate yards, C&NW, now UP, Milwaukee Road)
 Willow Springs (BNSF, intermodal)
 Yard Center (UP)
 Decatur: Decatur Yard [NS)
 Dupo: Dupo Yard (UP)
 East Peoria: East Peoria Yard (TZPR)
 East Peoria: East Peoria Yard (Toledo, Peoria & Western)
 East Saint Louis: Gateway Yard (64)(Alton and Southern Railway – Hump Yard)
 Galesburg: Galesburg Yard (BNSF– Hump Yard)
 Havana: Quiver Yard (Illinois & Midland Railroad)
 Kankakee: Kankakee Yard (NS)
 Madison: Madison Yard (TRRA)
 Ottawa: Fremont Street Yard (IR) 
 Pekin: Powerton Yard (Illinois & Midland Railroad)
 Silvis: Silvis Yard (Iowa Interstate)
 Springfield: Shops Yard (Illinois & Midland Railroad)

Indiana
 Avon: Avon Yard (CSXT)
 Elkhart: Elkhart Young Yard (72+15) (NS)
 Fort Wayne: Fort Wayne Yard (NS)
 Gary: Kirk Yard (Elgin, Joliet & Eastern, now CN)
 Hammond: Gibson Yard (Indiana Harbor Belt)
 Indianapolis: Hawthorne Yard (CSXT)
 Jeffersonville: Jeff Yard (Louisville & Indiana)

Iowa
 Council Bluffs: Council Bluffs Yard (Iowa Interstate & Union Pacific)
 Davenport: Nahant Yard (CP)
 Des Moines: Short Line Yard (UP)
 Mason City: Mason City Yard (CP)
 South Amana: South Amana (Iowa Interstate)
 Waterloo: Waterloo Yard (CN)

Kansas
 Kansas City: Argentine Yard (BNSF)
 Kansas City: Armourdale Yard (UP)
 Kansas City: Mill Street Yard (KCT, formerly Gateway Western Railroad),Now Kaw River RR (Watco)

Kentucky 
 Louisville: Prime F. Osborn Yard (CSXT)
 Louisville: Youngtown Yard (NS)
 Louisville: Oak Street Yard (Paducah & Louisville)
 Danville: Danville Yard (NS)
 Ludlow: Ludlow Yard (NS)
 Russell: Russell Yard (CSXT)
 Corbin: Corbin Yard (CSXT)

Louisiana 
 Alexandria: 
 Alexandria Yard (KCS)
 Alexandria Yard (UP)
 Baton Rouge area:
 Addis Yard (UP)
 Baton Rouge Yard (CN)
 Baton Rouge Yard (KCS)
 Geismar Yard (CN)
 Lafayette: 
 Lafayette North Yard (BNSF)
 Lafayette South Yard (BNSF)
 Lake Charles area:
 Edgerly Plastic Yard (UP)
 Lake Charles Yard (UP)
 Livonia: Livonia Yard (UP)
 New Orleans area:
 Avondale Yard (BNSF and UP)
 Destrahan Yard (CN)
 France Yard (NOPB)
 Gentilly Yard (CSXT)
 Mays Yard (CN)
 New Orleans Yard (KCS)
 Oliver Yard (NS)
 Shreveport, Louisiana area:
 Deramus Yard (KCS)

Maine
 Auburn:
 Danville Junction (Pan Am Railways, St. Lawrence and Atlantic Railroad)
 Lewiston Junction (St. Lawrence and Atlantic Railroad)
 Bangor: Bangor Yard (Pan Am Railways)
 Brownville: Brownville Junction (Eastern Maine Railway, Canadian Pacific Railway)
 Brunswick: Brunswick Yard (Pan Am Railways, Amtrak, Maine Department of Transportation)
 Hermon: Northern Maine Junction (Pan Am Railways, Canadian Pacific Railway)
 Mattawamkeag: Mattawamkeag Yard (Pan Am Railways, Eastern Maine Railway)
 Millinocket: Millinocket Yard (Maine Northern Railway, Canadian Pacific Railway)
 Portland: 
 Yard 8 (Pan Am Railways, Maine International Marine Terminal)
 Yard 10 (Pan Am Railways, Amtrak)
 Yard 11 (Pan Am Railways)
 Rockland: Rockland Yard (Maine Department of Transportation)
 Rumford: Rumford Yard (Pan Am Railways)
 South Portland: 
 Rigby Yard (Pan Am Railways)
 Yard 3 (Pan Am Railways, Turner's Island Railroad)
 Yard 6 (Pan Am Railways)
 Waterville: Waterville Shops (Pan Am Railways)
 Westbrook: Yard 12 (Pan Am Railways)

Maryland 
 Baltimore
 Bayview Yards (CSXT and NS)
 Canton/Coal Yard (NS)
 Penn Mary Yard (CTN)
 Cumberland: Cumberland Yard (CSXT)
 Hagerstown: Hagerstown Terminal (CSXT)

Massachusetts 
 Boston:
 Beacon Park Yard (CSXT, closed 2013)
 Boston Engine Terminal (MBTA)
 Southampton Street Yard (MBTA/Amtrak)
 Readville (CSXT)
 Elsewhere in Massachusetts
 Ayer: Hill Yard (Pan Am)
 East Deerfield (Pan Am)
 Fitchburg (Pan Am)
 Framingham: North Yard / Nevins Yards (CSXT)
 Gardner (Pan Am/PW)
 Lawrence (Pan Am)
 Lowell (Pan Am)
 Palmer (NECR/MCER/CSXT)
 West Springfield (CSXT/CSOR)
 Worcester (CSXT/PW)
 Various Grafton & Upton yards

Michigan 
 Battle Creek: Battle Creek Yard (CN)
 Detroit: Livernois Yard—aka Junction Yard (Conrail Shared Assets: CSXT and NS)
 Grand Rapids: Hugart Yard (GDLK; Took over for NS in 2009)
 Flint, Michigan |South Yard (CN)
 Flat Rock: Flat Rock Yard (CN)
 Kalamazoo: Gearhart Yard (GDLK; Took over for NS in 2009)
 Lansing: Cory Yard (CN)
 Pontiac, MI Pontiac Yard
 Wyoming: Wyoming Yard (CSXT)

Minnesota 
 Duluth: Proctor Yard (CN)
 Duluth: Rice's Point Yard (BNSF)
 Duluth: Rice's Point Yard (CP)
 Minneapolis: Humboldt Yard (CP)
 Minneapolis: Northtown Yard (55) (BNSF)
 Minneapolis: Shoreham Yards (CP)
 Northfield: Northfield Yard (UP, CP, PGR)
 Ranier: Ranier Yard (CN)
 St. Paul: Midway Yard (Minnesota Commercial)
 St. Paul: Pig's Eye Yard (CP)
 St. Paul: Hoffman Yard (UP)
 South St. Paul: South St. Paul Yard (UP)
 Valley Park: Valley Park Yard (UP)
 Virginia: Virginia Yard (CN)
 Waseca: Waseca Yard (CP)

Missouri 
 Kansas City: Neff Yard (42) (UP) Closed October 2019.
 Kansas City: Knoche/Joint Agency Yard (KCS/CP)
 Kansas City: Kansas City SmartPort (KCS, intermodal, autos)
 Kansas City: North Kansas City Avondale Yard (NS)
 Kansas City: Birmingham (NS, intermodal, autos)
 North Kansas City: Murray Yard (BNSF bulk commodities marshaling terminal; former hump)
 St. Louis: Chouteau Yard (BNSF)
 Springfield: North Springfield Yard (BNSF)
 Springfield: South Springfield Yard (BNSF)
 Springfield: Springfield Yard (BNSF)

Nebraska 
 Lincoln:
 Havelock Yard (BNSF)
 Lincoln: Hobson Yard (BNSF)
 North Platte: Bailey Yard (64+50) (The largest yard in the world) (UP)
 Alliance:

Nevada
Elko: Elko Yard (UP)
Las Vegas: Arden Yard (UP)
Sparks: Sparks Yard (UP)
Winnemucca: Winnemucca Yard (UP)

New Hampshire 
 Berlin: Berlin Yard (St. Lawrence and Atlantic Railroad)
 Concord: Concord Yard (New England Southern Railroad, New Hampshire Central Railroad)
 Conway: North Conway Depot and Railroad Yard (Conway Scenic Railroad)
 Dover: Dover Yard (Pan Am Railways, New Hampshire Northcoast Railroad)
 Nashua: Nashua Yard (Pan Am Railways)

New Jersey 
 Camden: Pavonia Yard (32) (Conrail Shared Assets: CSXT & NS)
 Jersey City:
Croxton Yard (NS)
Greenville Yard (Port Jersey)
 Kearny: South Kearney Terminal (CSXT)
 Linden Yard (SIR)
 Little Ferry Yard (CSXT, NYSW, Conrail)
 Newark: Oak Island Yard (CSXT and NS)
 North Bergen Yard (CSXT and NYSW)

New York 
 Binghamton – East Binghamton Yard (NS)
 Middle Yard (NS) 
 Bevier Street Yard (NS)
Buffalo:
 Bison Yard (NS)
Black Rock Rail Yard (CN)
 Frontier Yard (CSXT)
East Syracuse: De Witt Yard (CSXT)
Mechanicville (Pan Am Southern, intermodal)
New York City
Arlington Yard (Staten Island Railway)
High Bridge Facility (Metro-North Passenger and Maintenance Yard)
Hillside Facility (LIRR Passenger Yard)
Oak Point Yard (CSXT Marshalling)
Sunnyside Yard (Amtrak, NJ Transit Passenger Yard)
West Side Yard (LIRR Passenger Yard)
Rochester:
 Brooks Avenue Yard (Rochester and Southern RR)
 Goodman Street Yard (CSXT)
Selkirk: Selkirk Yard (CSXT)

North Carolina 
 Charlotte: Charlotte Yard (NS)
 Charlotte: Pinoca Yard (CSXT)
 Hamlet: Hamlet Yard (CSXT)
 Linwood: Spencer Yard (NS)
 Raleigh: Glenwood Yard (NS)

North Dakota 
 Enderlin, North Dakota: Enderlin Yard (CP)
 Harvey, North Dakota: Harvey Yard (CP)
 Mandan, North Dakata: Mandan Yard (BNSF)
 Minot, North Dakota: Gavin Yard (BNSF)
 Minot, North Dakota: Minot Yard (CP)

Ohio 
 Bellevue: Bellevue Yard (NS)
 Cincinnati: June Street Yard (CSXT)
 Cincinnati: Queensgate Yard (CSXT)
 Cincinnati: Storrs Yard (CSXT)
 Cincinnati: Gest Street Yard (NS)
 Cleveland: Collinwood Yard (CSXT)
 Cleveland: Rockport Yard (NS)
 Cleveland: Clark Avenue Yard (CSXT)
 Columbus: Buckeye Yard East Side Of Yard Intermodel(CSXT), (NS) Storage Only & Local Interchange w/ Camp Chase Industrial Railroad
 Columbus: Columbus Yard, Corr Road (CSXT)
 Columbus: Parsons Yard (CSXT)
 Columbus: Watkins Yard (NS)
 Dayton: Needmore Yard (CSXT)
 Fairfield: Wayne Yard (Closed, (CSXT)
 Hamilton: South Hamilton Yard (Closed 1988, (CSXT)
 Hamilton: Woods Yard (Closed 2013, (CSXT)
 Lima: South Lima Yard (CSXT)
 Mariemont: Clare Yard (CET), (NS)
 Middletown: Reed Yard (AK Steel)
 Middletown: New Reeds Yard (NS)
 Moraine: Moraine Yard (NS)
 Newark: Ohio Central Rail Yard Newark (OHCR)
 New Miami: New River Yard (CSXT)
 North Baltimore: North Baltimore Intermodal Yard (CSXT)
 North Excello: Lind Yard (CSXT)
 Norwood: McCullough Yard (Indiana & Ohio)
 Sharonville: Sharon Yard (NS)
 Toledo: Air Line Yard (NS)
 Toledo: Stanley Yard (CSXT)
 Toledo: Walbridge Yard (CSXT)
 Willard: Willard Yard (CSXT))

Oklahoma 
 Alva: Alva Yard (BNSF)
 Oklahoma City: Harter Yard (UP) (ex MKT)
 Oklahoma City: North Yard (AKA East Yard) (WATCO) (ex- BNSF, BN, SLSF)
 Oklahoma City: Nowers Yard (BNSF)
 Oklahoma City: South Yard (AKA Flynn Yard) (BNSF) (ex- ATSF)
 Owasso: Owasso Yard (SLWC/SKOL) 
 Tulsa: Cherokee Yard (BNSF, Hump)

Oregon 
 Eugene: Eugene Yard (UP)
 Hermiston: Hinkle Yard (UP)
 Medford: Medford Yard (CORP)
 Klamath Falls
 Klamath Falls Yard (UP)
 Klamath Falls Yard (BNSF)
 Portland
 Albina Yard (UP)
 Barnes Yard (Union Pacific Bulk and Intermodel Terminal)
Brooklyn Yard (UP)
 Willbridge Yard (BNSF)
 Lake Yard (BNSF/UP/PTRC)
 Terminal 6/East St. John (BNSF)
 Winchester: Winchester Yard (CORP)

Pennsylvania 
Allentown (NS)
 Conway Yard (54+53) (NS)
 Duryea yard (10+01) (RBMN)
 Harrisburg area:
Enola Yard (79) (NS)
Harrisburg Yard (NS)
Rutherford Yard (NS)
 Langhorne: Woodbourne Yard (CSXT)
 Reading: Spring Street Yard (NS)
 Philadelphia: South Philadelphia Yard*
 Philadelphia: West Philadelphia Yard*
 Scranton: Scranton Yard (DL/Steamtown)
 Taylor: Taylor Yard (NS)
 York: Windsor Street Yard (NS)
 Morrisville: Morrisville Yard (CSAO)

Rhode Island 
 North Kingstown: Davisville Yard (PW/Seaview Railroad)
 Providence/Pawtucket: Northup Avenue Yard (Providence and Worcester/Amtrak/MBTA Commuter Rail)
 Valley Falls: Valley Falls Yard (PW)

Tennessee 
 Chattanooga: DeButts Yard (60) (NS)
 Chattanooga: Wauhatchie Yard (CSXT)
 Knoxville: John Sevier Yard (NS)
 Memphis: Harrison (formerly Johnston) Yard (CN)
 Memphis: Leewood Yard (CSXT)
 Memphis: Tennessee Yard (BNSF)
 Nashville: Radnor Yard (CSXT)
 Nashville: Kayne Ave. Yard (CSXT)

Texas 
 Arlington: Arlington Yard (UP)
 Beaumont: Beaumont Yard (UP)
 Fort Worth: Davidson Yard (UP)
 Fort Worth: Tower 55 (UP/BNSF)
 Garland: Garland Yard (KCS)
 Houston: Englewood Yard (UP)
 Kendleton: Kendleton Yard (KCS)
 Mesquite: Mesquite Intermodal Facility (UP)
 Slaton: Slaton Yard (BNSF/South Plains Lamesa Railroad)

Utah
Helper: Helper Yard (UP/Utah)
Midvale: Midvale Yard (BNSF/Utah Southern)
Provo: Provo Yard (UP/BNSF/Utah)
Ogden: Riverdale Yard (UP/Utah Central)
Salt Lake City: North Yard (UP) (Closed April 2019)
Salt Lake City: Roper Yard (UP)

Virginia 
 Alexandria: Potomac Yard* (RF&P)
 Norfolk: Lamberts Point Yard (NS, coal)
 Chesapeake, Virginia: Portlock Yard (NS, Intermodal, mixed freight)
 Chesapeake, Virginia: Berkley Yard ( Norfolk and Portsmouth Belt Line Railroad / CSXT ) (mixed freight)
 Virginia Beach, Virginia: Little Creek Yard ( Buckingham Branch Railroad ) (mixed freight)
 Richmond: Fulton Yard (CSXT)
 Roanoke, Virginia Roanoke Terminal (NS, coal mixed freight)

Washington 
Auburn: Auburn Yard*
Cheney: Cheney Yard (BNSF/WER)
Coulee City: Coulee City Yard (WER)
Everett: Delta Yard (BNSF)
Fife: Fife Yard (UP)
Davenport: Davenport Yard (WER)
Kettle Falls: Kettle Falls Yard (STPP)
 Longview: 
 Longview Junction (LVSW)
 Longview (LVSW)
Marshal: (UP/BNSF/SSPR) 
Newport: Newport Yard (POVA)
Pasco:
Pasco Yard (BNSF)
Lampson Yard (BNSF)
Reardan: Reardan Yard (WER)
Seattle:
Argo Yard (UP) 
Balmer Yard (BNSF)
 South Seattle (BNSF)
 Stacy Yard/Seattle Intermodal Gateway (BNSF)
Spokane:
 East Spokane Yard (UP)
Erie Street Yard (BNSF/UP)
 Hillyard Yard (BNSF)
 Yardley Yard (BNSF)
Tacoma: Tide Flats Yard (TMRW), Tacoma Yard (BNSF) 
Usk: Usk Yard & Shops (POVA)
Vancouver: Vancouver Yard (BNSF)
Warden: Warden Yard (BNSF)
Wishram: Wishram Yard (BNSF)

West Virginia 
 Bluefield: Bluefield Yard (NS)
 Grafton: Grafton Yard (CSXT)
 Keyser: Keyser Yard (CSXT)
 Prichard: Prichard Yard (NS)
 Williamson: Williamson Yard (NS)

Wisconsin 
Altoona: Altoona Yard (UP)
 Butler: Butler Yard (UP)
 Fond du Lac: Shops Yard (CN)
 Green Bay: Green Bay Yard (CN)
 Janesville: Janesville Yard (WSOR)
La Crosse: La Crosse Yard (BNSF)
La Crosse: La Crosse Yard (CP)
Madison: Madison Yard (WSOR)
Milwaukee: Mitchell Street Yard
Milwaukee: North Milwaukee Yard (WSOR)
Milwaukee: Muskego Yard (CP)
Milwaukee: National Avenue Yard
Neenah: Neenah Yard (CN)
Portage: Portage Yard (CP)
Stevens Point: Stevens Point Yard (CN)
Superior: 28th Street Yard (BNSF)
Superior: Allouez Yard (BNSF)
Superior: Itasca Yard (UP)
Superior: Old Town Yard (BNSF)
Superior: Pokegama Yard (CN)
Superior: Stinson Yard (CP)
Wausau: Wausau Yard (CN)
Wisconsin Rapids: Wisconsin Rapids Yard (CN)

Mexico 
 Estado de México
 Tlalnepantla de Baz: Valle de México Patio Clasificación (48) (Ferrovalle,hump yard)

Europe

British Isles 
 Ireland: Within the Republic of Ireland and Northern Ireland there are no notable marshalling yards still extant.
North Wall yard in Dublin is used for loading per way materials trains and stabling unused stock. Also host a small wagon repair shop used to maintain ore and container wagons.
 UK (excluding Northern Ireland): British Railways undertook a major programme of investment in marshalling yards in the early 1960s, some of which were arguably obsolete before they even opened. Many have since been closed entirely. Those that remain have been substantially dismantled. None retain hump facilities and instead see only very limited flat-shunting. As of 2009, DB Schenker Rail (UK) operates the following marshalling yards, defined as sites "where trains can be marshalled or re-marshalled using resident pilot locomotives, ground staff and train examination staff".
Ayr: Falkland Yard
 Birmingham: Bescot Yard (reconstructed 1966)
 Birmingham: Washwood Heath
 Cardiff: Cardiff Tidal Sidings
 Didcot: Didcot Yard
 Doncaster: Decoy Yard and Belmont Yard
 Edinburgh: Millerhill Yard (opened 1963; substantially closed 1983)
 Glasgow: Mossend
 Hither Green London
 North Kent: Hoo Junction Yard, Gravesend
 Newport: Alexandra Dock Junction (Newport Junction) Sidings
 Nottingham: Toton Yard
 Port Talbot: Margam Knuckle Yard (opened 1960)
 Swansea: Swansea Burrows Sidings
 Middlesbrough: Tees Yard, Thornaby (opened 1963)
 Birtley: Tyne Yard, Lamesley (opened 1963)
 Wakefield: Healey Mills Marshalling Yard (opened 1963,closed 2012)
 Warrington (serving Liverpool and Manchester): Arpley Sidings
 Wiltshire: Westbury Sidings
 London: Willesden Brent Sidings, and Wembley Yard (New construction on the site of the former Willesden Yard)
Historically significant marshalling yards, now dismantled or used for other purposes
 Dearne Valley: Wath concentration yard, for South Yorkshire coal traffic to Manchester (opened 1907; closed 1988)
 Carlisle: Kingmoor Yard (opened 1963) Still in continuous use for traffic as of 2011.
 Crewe: Basford Hall Yard (opened 1901; electrified 1961; now a dedicated container train intermodal hub.)
 March: Whitemoor Yard,  (opened by the LNER in 1929; now the site of Whitemoor Prison. Although some parts remain operational)
 Liverpool: Edge Hill "Gridiron" (opened 1873)
 London: Temple Mills, Stratford (reconstructed 1958)
 London: Ripple Lane Yard, Barking (opened 1958; closed 1965)
 London: Feltham Yard (opened by LSWR 1917; closed 1969)
 London: Cricklewood (built by the Midland Railway in the 1870s)
 Perth: (opened 1962)
 Rogiet: Severn Tunnel Junction yard (reconstructed 1960/62; closed 1987)
 Sheffield: Tinsley Marshalling Yard (opened 1965, closed beginning 1985 – site now an intermodal terminal)
 York: Dringhouses

Nordic countries 
 Norway
 Sweden
 Gävle (18)
 Borlänge (24)
 Hallsberg (marshalling yard) (32)
 Göteborg: Sävenäs (34)
 Helsingborg (24)
 Malmö (26)
 Finland
 Hamina: Poitsila yard
 Helsinki: Vuosaari yard
 Helsinki: Pasila yard (Former hump yard. Has little use for yard in its size.)
 Imatra: Freight yard
 Joensuu: Peltola and Sulkulahti yards
 Kokkola: Ykspihlaja freight yard
 Kokkola: Ykspihlaja mid-yard
 Kotka: Hovinsaari yard (former hump yard)
 Kotka: Mussalo and Kotolahti yards
 Kouvola: Marshalling yard (hump yard) (12 + 48)
 Oulu: Nokela yard (Former hump yard)
 Pieksämäki: Marshalling yard ( ormer hump yard. Mainly used as storage for rolling stock.)
 Riihimäki: Korttio (9 + 24) (former hump yard)
 Seinäjoki: Freight yard
 Tampere: Viinikka (hump yard) (11 + 31)
 Denmark

Baltic states 
 Estonia
 Tallinn: Ülemiste (16)
 Latvia
 Ventspils
 Riga: (marshalling yard) (26)
 Rēzekne II
 Daugavpils (marshalling yard) (26)
 Lithuania:
 Šiauliai: Radviliškis (largest yard in baltic region)
 Vilnius: Vaidotai (16)
 Vilnius: Vilnius Intermodal Terminal
 Kaunas: Kaunas Intermodal Terminal

Eastern Europe 
 Belarus
Maladsetschna: (11)
Minsk: (marshalling yard) (21)
Orscha: (at main station) (12?)
Mahiljou: (on the Dnepr river) (16)
Schlobin:
Homel: (unusual bilateral yard, with two marshalling sections on different lines) Homel'-Nečetnyj line (21), Minsk and Homel'-Četnyj (12) tracks in the direction of the route from Brest
Baranawitschy: (located at central station) (15)
Brest-Vostočny : 'Eastern' (10 + 13)
Brest -Severny 'northern' (12 + 12): Dual gauge system
 Ukraine
Konotop
Kyiv: Darnytsia (24 + 18)
Kowel: Kovel' (11)
Lviv: Klepariv (19), L'viv-Zachid (Western railway station) (20)
Chop: Čop (16), Vuzlove (16)
Zhmerynka/Vinnytsia: Žmerynka-Podil's'ka, Žmerynka-Vantažna (railway station) (22?)
Znamianka: Znam'janka-Sortuval'na (marshalling yard) (28)
Kremenchuk: Kremenčuk-Čerednyky
Poltava: Poltava-Pivdenna-Sortuval'na (southern marshalling yard) (21)
Kharkiv: Osnova (28 + 20), Charkiv-Sortuval'nyj (22)
Kupiansk: Kup'jans'k-Sortuval'nyj (bilateral yard 24? + 16?)
Donbas:
Krasnyj Lyman: (zweiseitig, 33 + 24)
Horliwka: Mykytjivka (15 + 17)
Debaltseve: Debal'ceve-Sortuval'na (28 + 23)
Ilovaisk: Ilovajs'k (17 + 12)
Donetsk: Yasynuvata-Sortuval'na (32 + 42)
PokrovskPokrovs'k
Volnovakha: Volnovacha (20)
Zaporizhia: Zaporižžja-Live (22)
Dnipro: Nyžn'odniprovs'k-Vuzol (railway junction) (31 + 16)
Krywyj Rih: Kryvyj Rih-Sortuval'nyj (marshalling yard) (21)
Odesa: Odesa-Sortuval'na, Odesa-Zastava I (22)
Rozdilna: Rozdil'na-Sortuval'na (28)
Mykolajiw: Mykolajiv-Sortuval'nyj (18)
Dzhankoi: Džankoj (24)
 Moldova
Moldova
Chişinău (18)
Transdenistra – no yard

Central Europe 
 Poland
 Częstochowa Towarowa – ul. Boya-Żeleńskiego 7/9, 42-200 Częstochowa – 
 Dąbrowa Górnicza Towarowa – Zakawie, 42-530 Dąbrowa Górnicza – 
 Jaworzno-Szczakowa – ul. Kolejarzy 22, 43-602 Jaworzno – 
 Kielce Herbskie – ul. Oskara Kolberga, 25-620 Kielce – 
 Kobylany – Kobylany, 21-540 Małaszewicze – 
 Kraków Nowa Huta – ul. Ruszcza 1, 31-988 Kraków – 
 Łazy – ul. Grunwaldzka, 42-450 Łazy – 
 Łódź Olechów – ul. Jędrzejowska 170, 93-636 Łódź – 
 Małaszewicze – 21-540 Małaszewicze – 
 Medyka – ul. Zaokop, 37-732 Medyka – 
 Poznań Franowo – ul. Piwna 6, 61-065 Poznań – 
 Rybnik Towarowy – ul. Wodzisławska 249B, 44-270 Rybnik – 
 Skarżysko-Kamienna – ul. Kolejowa, 26-110 Skarżysko-Kamienna – 
 Sławków Euroterminal – ul. Groniec 1, 41-260 Sławków – 
 Tarnowskie Góry – ul. Częstochowska 7, 42-600 Tarnowskie Góry
 Tarnów Filia – ul. Przemysłowa 10, 33-100 Tarnów
 Warszawa Praga – ul. Pożarowa 2, 03-308 Warszawa – 
 Wrocław Brochów – ul. Mościckiego, 52-110 Wrocław – 
 Węgliniec – ul. Kolejowa, 59-940 Węgliniec – 
 Zabrzeg-Czarnolesie – ul. Czarnoleska 14, 43-516 Zabrzeg – 
 Czech Republic
 Děčín hlavní nádraží (14)
 Most Nové nádraží (30)
 Plzeň: Plzeň seřaďovací nádraží (22)
 Prague
Praha-Libeň (15)
Praha–Uhříněves (cs)
 Nymburk hlavní nádraží (29)
 Česká Třebová seřaďovací nádraží (38)
 Ostrava hlavní nádraží (20 + 20)
 Přerov přednádraží (32)
 Brno: Brno Maloměřice (22)
 České Budějovice seřaďovací nádraží (22)
  přednádraži (13)
 Slovakia
 Žilina zriaďovacia stanica (18 + 22)
 Žilina-Teplička: In construction, expected finish date 2010
 Košice nákladná stanica (21)
 Zvolen východ (12)
 Čierna nad Tisou (21 + 16)
 Bratislava-Východ (East station, 37)
 Štúrovo (26)
 Dunajská Streda
 Hungary
 Székesfehérvár (12)
 Budapest Ferencváros rendező pu. (32 (+ 28 temporary closed))
 Miskolc rendező pu. (30)
 Záhony Fényeslitke Déli rendező pu. (railway station south yard, 24)
 Dombóvár (14)

Germany 
In Germany due to ongoing consolidation it is likely that some yards will close. The ones likely to continue in operation are marked in bold.

 Northern Germany
 Rostock Seehafen (32)
 Hamburg: Maschen Marshalling Yard (Built 1977, 48 + 64) Europe's biggest yard
 Osnabrück Rbf (34)
 Hannover Seelze Rbf (17 + 34)
 Eastern Germany
 Berlin (Potsdam): Seddin (Potsdam) (28 + 15)
 Senftenberg South (19), North closed
 Central Germany
 Halle (Saale) Gbf (36)
 Leipzig: Engelsdorf (Leipzig) (26)
 Dresden-Friedrichstadt Rbf (34)
 Western Germany
 Bebra Rbf (21)
 Kassel Rbf (11 + 5 + 2, + 9 long and 4 short tracks) outdated
 Ruhrgebiet
 Hamm (Westf) (14) for decades was Europe's largest yard
 Herne Wanne-Eickel Hbf
 Oberhausen-Osterfeld Süd (40)
 Schwerte (Ruhr) (16)
 Hagen-Vorhalle (40)
 Siegen: Kreuztal Güterbahnhof (19)
 Cologne: Gremberg (31 + 32); Köln-Kalk Nord (24)
 Mainz: Mainz-Bischofsheim (22) The station is nowadays not within the political boundaries of the city of Mainz in Rhineland-Palatinate, but in the municipality of Bischofsheim, Hesse
 Saarbrücken Rbf (25)
 Southern Germany
 Mannheim Rbf (42 + 41) second largest Rbf in Deutschland
 Stuttgart: Kornwestheim Rbf (35)
 Nürnberg Rbf (60)
 Ingolstadt Hbf (20)
 München Nord Rbf (40)

Benelux 
 Netherlands
 Rotterdam: Kijfhoek (42)
 Belgium
 Antwerp-North (40 + 56)
 Ghent-Zeehaven (32)
 Bruges: Zeebrugge-Vorming (28; after expansion 24 + 30)
 Liège: Kinkempois-Formation (38)
 Namur: Ronet-Formation (41) For international ISO-Container
 Charleroi: Monceau-sur-Sambre-Formation (32)
 Luxemburg
 Bettembourg: Bettembourg-Triage (28)

France 
 Nord-Pas-de-Calais: Somain (32)
 Metz: Woippy-Triage (48), Largest yard in France
 Paris: Le Bourget-Triage (48), Villeneuve-Saint-Georges-Triage (48)
 Bordeaux: Hourcade (48)
 Dijon: Gevrey-Triage (48)
 Lyon: Sibelin-Triage (44)
 Marseille/Fos-sur-Mer: Miramas (48)
 Strasbourg: Hausbergen
 Mulhouse: Mulhouse-Nord
 Toulouse: Fenouillet (47)

Alpine countries 
 Switzerland:
 Basel SBB RB (in Muttenz) (43 planned reduction to 32 + 32)
 Buchs Canton St. Gallen (16)
 Zürich: Rangierbahnhof Limmattal (RBL), in the Limmat Valley between Spreitenbach and Dietikon (64)
 Biel/Bienne-Mett RB (22) To close in 2009
 Lausanne Triage (in Denges) (38) Adding of 7 more tracks planned
 Chiasso Smistamento (24)
 Austria:
Salzburg-Gnigl (22)
 Wels Vbf (Verschiebebahnhof) (30)
 Linz Vbf (29) Expansion planned
 Vienna: Wien Zvbf (Zentralverschiebebahnhof) (48)
 Innsbruck: Hall in Tirol (20)
 Villach Süd (40)
 In Styria due to the lack of an efficient marshalling yard shunting is divided between Selzthal, Graz Vbf und Bruck an der Mur freight station (the latter has no hump)

Southeastern Europe 
 Slovenia
 Ljubljana: Zalog (39)
 Croatia
 Zagreb ranžirni kolodvar (48)
 Bosnia and Herzegovina (Bosnian/Croatian fed.): No yard
 Bosnia and Herzegovina (Serbia)
 Doboj (14)
 Serbia
 Belgrade: Beograd ranžirna Makiš (120)
 Niš ranžirna stanica Popovac
 Novi Sad: Ranžirna stanica Novi Sad
 Lapovo: Ranžirna stanica Lapovo
 Montenegro: No current yards
 Romania
 Iaşi: Socola (24)
 Dej Triaj (25)
 Oradea Est Triaj (24)
 Arad (18)
 Timișoara: Ronaț Triaj (23)
 Caransebeş Triaj (24)
 Simeria Triaj (28)
 Teiuş: Coşlariu (24)
 Braşov Triaj (26)
 Adjud (24)
 Galaţi: Barboşi Triaj (32)
 Ploieşti Triaj (31)
 Piteşti: Goleşti
 Craiova Triaj (20)
 Bucharest: București Triaj (16)
 Constanţa: Palas (23)
 Bulgaria
 Rousse: Russe razp. (12) (Note: razp. bulg. разпределител)
 (Varna): Sindel (24)
 Varna: Varna razp.
 Gorna Oryahovitsa: Gorna Oryahovitsa razp. (29)
 Sofia: Poduyane-razp. (32)
 Burgas razp. (20)
 Plovdiv: Plovdiv razp. (27)
 North Macedonia
 Skopje-Trubarevo (24)
 Albania: No yard
 Greece
 Thessalonika: Thessaloniki-Dialogis (16)
 Turkey (European part)
 Istanbul: Halkalı yard (10) (Originally larger, half of the tracks used for freight trains were closed when the adjacent Halkalı station was rebuilt and expanded.)
 Kapıkule: Kapıkule yard (13)

Southern Europe 
 Italy
 Cervignano del Friuli: Cervignano Smistamento (32)
 Milan: Milano Smistamento (48)
 Turin: Torino Orbassano (32) terminus
 Alessandria Smistamento (37) terminus
 Bologna San Donato (32 + 22) terminus
 Naples: Marcianise Smistamento (32) South of Caserta
 Spain
 León Classificación (19)
 Saragossa: Zaragoza-la Almozara (13)
 Barcelona: Can Tunis (16) hump removed
 Madrid: Vicálvaro Classificación (30)
 Córdoba-Mercancías (8)
 Portugal
 Entroncamento (13)

Russia 
 Sankt-Peterburg-Sortirovochnyy-Moskovskiy
 Volkhovstroy I
 Smolensk-Sortirovochnyy
 Bekasovo-Sortirovochnoye
 Lyublino-Sortirovochnoye
 Bryansk-L'govskiy
 Rybnoye
 Orekhovo-Zuyevo
 Yudino
 Agryz
 Nizhniy Novgorod-Sortirovochnyy
 Lyangasovo
 Losta
 Yaroslavl'-Glavnyy
 Bataysk
 Likhaya
 Liski
 Kochetovka I
 Im. Maksima Gor'kogo
 Anisovka
 Penza III
 Syzran' I
 Dema
 Kinel'
 Perm'-Sortirovochnaya
 Yekaterinburg-Sortirovochnyy
 Voynovka
 Chelyabinsk-Glavnyy
 Orsk
 Orenburg
 Moskovka
 Vkhodnaya
 Altayskaya
 Inskaya
 Krasnoyarsk-Vostochnyy
 Tayshet
 Irkutsk-Sortirovochnyy
 Komsomol'sk-Sortirovochnyy
 Khabarovsk II

Asia 

India
Mughalsarai Railway Yard
Katni Railway Yard
Asansol Railway Yard
Bhilai Railway Marshalling Yard
Bondamunda Railway Yard
Bhusawal Railway Yard
Howrah Railway Yard
Sealdah ( Beliaghata ) Rail Yard 
Naihati Goods Sorting Yard 
Siliguri Railway Yard 
CSMT Railway Yard 
Jammu Tawi Railway Yard 
Rani Laxmi Bai Nagar Railway Yard 
Tambaram MG Railway Yard ( Now Abandoned ) 
New Guwahati Yard 
Lumding Yard 
New Tinsukia Yard 
ICF Coach Complex Yard 
Kalka NG Yard 
Bina Marshalling Yard
HAPA Marshalling Yard
Indonesia
Jakarta Kota Railway Yard, Jakarta
Cipinang Locomotive Rail Yard Jakarta
Depok Railway Yard, Depok, Largest Rail Yard in SouthEast Asia
Sidotopo Railway Yard, Surabaya
Kalimas Railway Yard, Surabaya
Semarang Gudang Railway Yard (closed), Semarang
China 
Mainland
 Zhengzhou North railway station (郑州北站), over 6,000 m long and over 800 m wide, described as Asia's largest marshalling yard
 Fengtai West railway station (a major freight terminal for Beijing)
 Wuhan North railway station (112 tracks)
 Nanxiang railway station, located in Shanghai
 Nanjing East railway station
 Xuzhou North railway station
 Zhuzhou North railway station
 Jiangcun railway station, located in Guangzhou
 Guiyang South railway station
 Chengdu North railway station – different from Chengdu railway station(passenger station) which is called "North railway station(火车北站)" by Chengdu citizens
 Sujiatun railway station
 Xinfengzhen(Town Xinfeng; 新丰镇) railway station
 Lanzhou North railway station
Hekou North railway station, connection between China's standard-gauge network and Vietnam's meter-gauge network
Houma North railway station
Hong Kong
 Ho Tung Lau Depot – maintenance facility for East Rail line
 Pat Heung Depot – maintenance facility for West Rail line
 Siu Ho Wan Depot – for Tung Chung line
 Hung Hom Freight Freight Terminus/Yard
 Kowloon Freight Yard
 Lo Wu Freight and Marshalling Yard
South Korea
 Busan : Busan Rail Yard, Busan High Speed Rail Yard (77, Gaya station)
 Daejeon : Daejeon Rail Yard (60, Daejeon Yard station)
 Goyang : Seoul High Speed Rail Yard (Haengsin station)
 Jecheon : Jecheon Rail Yard (70, Jecheon Yard station)
 Seoul : Seoul Rail Yard (102, Susaek station)
Sri Lanka

 Colombo Yard
 Rathmalana Shops
 Maradana & Dematagoda Running Sheds
Turkey

 Istanbul : Haydarpaşa yard (10)
 Ankara : Marşandiz Yard (20, Marshalling section of the much larger facility) 
 Eskişehir : Hasanbey Yard (9, Marshalling section of the Hasanbey Logistics Center)
 Eskişehir : Eskişehir yard (11, closed in 2012)
 Kayseri: Kayseri Yard
 Afyon: Afyon Yard
 Karabük: Karabük Yard
Thailand
 Bangkok : Bangsue Junction – Phahonyothin Yard
 Bangkok : Makkasan Workshop Yard
 Hatyai : Hatyai Junction Yard
 Nakhon Ratchasima : Nakhon Ratchasima Yard
 Laem Chabang : Port of Laem Chabang Yard
 Surat Thani : Ban Thung Phoe Junction Container Yard
 Thung Song : Thung Song Junction Yard

Africa 

 Kidatu, Tanzania – transhipment from  gauge to metre gauge.
 Dabuka, Zimbabwe

Oceania

Australia 

 Enfield, NSW standard gauge
 Mile End, SA
 Keswick, SA
 Kewdale, WA standard gauge
 Forrestfield, WA
 Dynon, VIC dual gauge
 Acacia Ridge, QLD dual gauge
 Bromelton QLD under construction; dual gauge

New Zealand 
 Westfield – North Island
 Southdown – North Island
 Te Rapa – North Island
 Middleton – South Island
 Lyttleton – South Island

South America

Brazil 
 Uvaranas
 Rio de Janeiro Docks
 Açailândia (Ferrovia Norte-Sul)

References

Further reading